ECW Hardcore Revolution is a professional wrestling video game released by Acclaim Entertainment, based on the professional wrestling promotion Extreme Championship Wrestling (ECW). The game was released for the Nintendo 64, PlayStation, Game Boy Color, and Dreamcast in 2000. It was the first wrestling game to be based on ECW, as well as the first professional wrestling video game to receive a Mature rating from the ESRB, although the Game Boy Color version was rated Everyone. Acclaim followed this title with the release of a sequel, ECW Anarchy Rulz, in August 2000.

Gameplay

Gameplay for ECW Hardcore Revolution is identical to WWF Attitude. Much of the content was the same, but with ECW images replacing all WWE owned material. The match rules are also retained.

Two (or more) participants attempt to meet one of the win conditions over their rival/s. They can reduce their opponent's resistance by decreasing their health. This is done by performing successful attacks and reversals.
 Pin - Performing a pin cover on a downed opponent, or using a pinning move, to hold their shoulders down while the referee counts to three. Pin attempts are only valid within the ring. They are automatically voided if interrupted or either player touches the ring ropes.
 Submission - Using a painful hold on a weakened opponent until they give up. These only work under same conditions as pin attempts.
 Count Out - Whenever a player leaves the ring for any reason, the referee begins a silent count to 10. The count resets each time a player leaves the ring. Any players outside of the ring whenever the referee reaches 10 is defeated. It is possible for all players to lose by count out. These rarely happened in ECW.
 TKO - If a player's health meter is completely depleted, they can be eliminated automatically. This option needs to be turned on in utilities.
 Decree of ECW - This is a three-point system that is used if the time limit expires before anyone has met the other win conditions. The first determines who has the most remaining health. If this does not determine a clear winner, then the player with the most health who performed the most successful attacks, taunts and reversals is the winner. If this still does not produce a clear winner, then the player who meets those conditions and has the lowest player number is the winner.
 DQ - This only occurs if a human controlled player wins a versus match after calling for their ally. Their opponent may be awarded the win by disqualification (DQ).

Nearly all of the main characters were performers and staff members involved with ECW during the game's production. Some personalities who had left the company before or during the production were left in as unlockable content. The additional "jobber" characters are loosely based on other ECW or Acclaim staff, or are completely fictional.

The season mode is similar to the one used in WWF Attitude. The player(s) must win matches to move up the rankings before they can challenge for championship titles at pay-per-view events. In 'Versus' career, the player must first challenge for the fictional Acclaim Championship. After clearing the first tier, the player moves on to the ECW Television Championship division, and then the ECW World Heavyweight Championship. The tag team career only allows players to compete for the ECW World Tag Team Championships.

The game features all of the attacks and taunts that appeared in WWF Attitude, with some renamed, as well as some new ones. However, many of the added moves are just duplicates of moves that are already in the game. For example, Danny Doring's finisher "Whambam Thankyou Maam" is identical to the "Double Arm DDT".

One of the unique features is that match commentary is performed by Joey Styles alone. This is one of the very few wrestling video games in existence to use just one commentator.

Reception

The Nintendo 64 and PlayStation versions received mixed reviews, while the Dreamcast and Game Boy Color versions received unfavorable reviews, according to the review aggregation website GameRankings.

Critics praised Joey Styles's commentary, and the use of weapons during the game. However, many reviews criticized Revolution for being a near copy of its predecessors, WWF Attitude and War Zone, and not reflecting ECW's unique style, just covering over everything with ECW wrestlers and themes. Daniel Erickson of NextGen gave the Dreamcast and Nintendo 64 versions negative reviews in two separate issues, calling the latter "One of the few games to inspire active anger and hate. Just having to handle the cart with our bare fingers made us feel dirty" (#63, March 2000); and later calling the former "A blatant insult to the intelligence of wrestling fans and Dreamcast owners" (#65, May 2000).

The Game Boy Color version was heavily criticized by critics and fans alike. Players complained about sluggish controls, poor sound effects and graphics and glitches. It was rated as one of the two worst GBC games of all time by MobyGames.com

See also

List of licensed wrestling video games
List of fighting games

References

External links
 
 

2000 video games
Dreamcast games
Hardcore Revolution
Game Boy Color games
Multiplayer and single-player video games
Nintendo 64 games
PlayStation (console) games
Video games developed in the United States